3D Classics is a label applied to certain updates of old games for the Nintendo 3DS, with added stereoscopic 3D functionality and updated features while retaining their original art style and graphics. There are two unrelated series of releases under the 3D Classics title: a first-party series of NES/Famicom and arcade games, and a Sega-published, M2-developed set of classic Sega games, mostly from Sega Mega Drive/Genesis and Sega arcade hardware.

Development
The first set of games in the series was developed by Arika and published by Nintendo. These releases were directed by Takao Nakano from the Special-Planning & Development Department of Nintendo. Development on this set of games began in 2009, starting with Namco Bandai Games' Xevious. They underestimated the amount of work required to add stereoscopic 3D to a 2D game, requiring much more work than a simple port. Arika attempted a 3D Classics version of the NES/Famicom game Tennis because the background had perspective, but found it looked unimpressive in 3D while requiring re-coding collision detection almost from scratch.

Games in the series published by Sega are branded as "Sega 3D Classics" and are developed by M2. Many of the Sega 3D Classics are remakes of games that originally used Sega's "Super Scaler" technology, which created a pseudo-3D effect by rapidly rotating and scaling large numbers of sprites.

Some of the Sega 3D Classics provide options that try to emulate the arcade experience, such as option to enable motion controls or show the screen tilt in games like After Burner II and Super Hang-On. 3D Sonic the Hedgehog allows players to switch between the Japanese and international versions of the game. Some Sega 3D Classics introduce new features altogether, such as "Super Dolphin" invincibility mode in Ecco the Dolphin and the Spin Dash in Sonic the Hedgehog (which is a technique originally introduced in Sonic the Hedgehog 2).

While the games are usually advertised as being based on the NES/Famicom or Sega Mega Drive/Genesis version of the game, the developers often take inspiration from the arcade version when adapting the game.

Release
The 3D Classics were originally announced shortly before the Nintendo eShop launched, with Excitebike being free for a limited time only before becoming a paid download.

Eight of the Sega 3D Classics comprised the retail title Sega 3D Fukkoku Archives, released on December 18, 2014 in Japan. It has not been released outside Japan, although the titles it is composed of were released on the Nintendo eShop internationally throughout 2013 and 2015 (all the component games had been released in Japan prior to the release of the compilation).

The second group of Sega 3D Classics were released in Japan starting in December 2013; in the West, they were released in 2015, with one of the five coming out each month. In Australia, after the release of 3D After Burner II, all remaining SEGA 3D Classics were delayed indefinitely; while many of the games were classified by the Australian Classification Board much earlier, they were not released in Australia until July 2, 2015.

Reception
Modojo's Chris Buffa criticized the Arika-developed 3D Classics for being remakes of uninteresting games, commenting that the 3D Classics line should focus on major titles such as Donkey Kong and The Legend of Zelda.

The Verge's Sam Byford complimented the Sega 3D Classics for making stereoscopic 3D "a feature", calling the 3D Classics "the most impressive use of 3D on Nintendo's console to date". Byford also commented that the added depth perception makes some of the games easier to play.

GamesRadar's Justin Towell praised the conversion of Super Hang-On to stereoscopic 3D, but noted that the 3D effect seems "a bit uneven in the far distance", and criticized the optional screen-tilt feature (which attempts to emulate sitting on a bike in an arcade) as pointless. Towell complimented 3D Space Harrier for its various screen modes and control options (especially the touch screen mode), as well as the new time trial mode. He also enjoyed the CRT TV simulation displayed in 3D Sonic the Hedgehog and 3D Altered Beast, although he found the effect fuzzy in Altered Beast due to the slow pace.

List of games
The games are sorted by title. To sort by other columns, click the corresponding icon in the header row.

Nintendo 3D Classics
All Nintendo 3D Classics were published by Nintendo and developed by Arika.

Sega 3D Classics
All Sega 3D Classics were published by Sega and developed by M2.

See also
List of Virtual Console games for Nintendo 3DS (Japan)
List of Virtual Console games for Nintendo 3DS (North America)
List of Virtual Console games for Nintendo 3DS (PAL region)
Virtual Console

References

Nintendo-related lists
Nintendo 3DS games

ja:3Dクラシックス